Psammoryctides barbatus is a species of annelids belonging to the family Naididae. The species was first recorded in 1860 by Adolf Eduard Grube. 

This species is most commonly found in Europe, especially Northern Europe, but it has been recorded in places such as Northern Africa, Siberia and the Chesapeake Bay.

References 

Naididae
Species described in 1891